Chocolate Swim is a free download album released in 2006 by Adult Swim and Chocolate Industries (through Williams Street Records).

Track listing
Kovas – "Up In Here" (3:59)	
Lady Sovereign – "Hoodie (Spank Rock Remix)" (3:51)	
Ghislain Poirier – "Mic Diplomat" (3:02)
Mos Def & Diverse – "Wylin Out (Kut Masta Kurt Remix)" (4:07)
Diverse – "Ain't Right (DJ Mitsu Remix)" (4:09)	
Vast Aire – "Super Friends (Edan Remix)" (3:58)

References

Albums free for download by copyright owner
Adult Swim albums
Williams Street Records compilation albums